Paul Scardon (6 May 1874 – 17 January 1954) was an actor, a producer, and a director on both Australian and New York stages.

When he was 15, Scardon debuted on stage as a contortionist in vaudeville. He progressed from that to pantomime and then joined a troupe headed by J. C. Williamson, touring New Zealand and Australia for five years. In 1905, he joined a company headed by Nance O'Neil, and that group's tour brought him to the United States.

Scardon's Broadway credits include Mrs. Bumpstead-Leigh (1911), Becky Sharp (1911), The Green Cockatoo (1910), Hannele (1910), The Debtors (1909), Agnes(1908), Our American Cousin (1908), and Brigadier Gerard (1906).

Scardon went to Hollywood in 1910. In motion pictures, he worked for Majestic Pictures, Reliance-Majestic Studios and Vitagraph Studios. He directed Blanche Sweet in Unwilling Husband, Bessie Barriscale in some of her most successful productions, and most of the melodramas which starred his wife, actress Betty Blythe. Retiring when sound films came in, Scardon returned to films as an actor in the 1940s, playing bit roles until he retired from the film industry in 1948.

Personal life and death 
At the time of his death, Scardon was married to actress Betty Blythe. On January 18, 1954, Scardon died of a heart attack in Fontana, California, at age 79.

Filmography

Actor

A Simple Life (1912, Short) – Cy Smith – Marie's Father
Uncle Tom's Cabin (1914) – Haley
The Sins of the Mothers (1914) – Anatole De Voie
The Juggernaut (1915) – Alexander Jones
The Goddess (1915) – Prof. Stilliter
The Battle Cry of Peace (1915) – Gen. Ulysses S. Grant
The Alibi (1916) – Walter Slayton
Man from Montreal (1939) – Trapper (uncredited)
Fighting Mad (1939)
The Green Hornet (1940, Serial) – Timothy Bryan [Ch. 7] (uncredited)
The Fatal Hour (1940) – Homer Lyons – Informant (uncredited)
Waterloo Bridge (1940) – Backdoor Stage Doorman (uncredited)
The Fargo Kid (1940) – Caleb Winters
Lady From Louisiana (1941) – Judge Wilson
The Son of Davy Crockett (1941) – Zeke
Today I Hang (1942) – Peter Hobbs
The Man Who Returned to Life (1942) – Reverend Tuller (uncredited)
My Favorite Blonde (1942) – Dr. Robert Higby (uncredited)
Mrs. Miniver (1942) – Nobby (uncredited)
Ten Gentlemen from West Point (1942) – Senator (uncredited)
Tish (1942) – Toronto Postal Clerk (uncredited)
A Yank at Eton (1942) – Old Cleaner (uncredited)
The Man from the Rio Grande (1943) – Hanlon – County Clerk
His Butler's Sister (1943) – Professor (uncredited)
The Adventures of Mark Twain (1944) – Rudyard Kipling (uncredited)
Kitty (1945) – Undertaker (uncredited)
The Daltons Ride Again (1945) – Attorney (uncredited)
Cinderella Jones (1946) – Judge Rutledge (uncredited)
Down Missouri Way (1946) – Prof. Lewis
Gentleman Joe Palooka (1946) – File Room Attendant (uncredited)
The Verdict (1946) – Sexton (uncredited)
Pursued (1947) – Juryman (uncredited)
Time Out of Mind (1947) – Butler (uncredited)
Joe Palooka in the Knockout (1947) – Railroad Clerk (uncredited)
Magic Town (1947) – Hodges
Merton of the Movies (1947) – Club Member (uncredited)
The Fabulous Texan (1947) – Citizen (uncredited)
Secret Beyond the Door (1947) – Owl Eyes (uncredited)
Joe Palooka in Fighting Mad (1948) – Dr. Burman
The Sign of the Ram (1948) – Perowen (uncredited)
Canon City (1948) – Joe Bondy
He Walked by Night (1948) – Liquor Store Proprietor (uncredited)
The Shanghai Chest (1948)
A Connecticut Yankee in King Arthur's Court (1949) – White Haired Peddler (uncredited)
The Doolins of Oklahoma (1949) – Minor Role (uncredited)
Samson and Delilah (1949) – Beggar (uncredited)
Belle of Old Mexico (1950) – Mr. Ambercrombie (uncredited) (final film role)

Director

The Alibi
All Man 
Apartment 29 
 Arsene Lupin (1917)
A Bachelor's Children 
Beating the Odds 
Beauty-Proof 
 The Breaking Point (1921)
The Broken Gate 
Children Not Wanted 
The Darkest Hour 
The Dawn of Freedom 
The Desired Woman 
The Enemy 
 False Kisses (1921)
Fighting Destiny 
The Gamblers 
A Game with Fate 
The Golden Gallows 
The Golden Goal (1918)
 The Green God (1918)
The Grell Mystery (1917)
The Hawk 
 Her Own Free Will (1924)
Her Right to Live 
 Her Unwilling Husband (1920)
The Hero of Submarine D-2 
 Hoarded Assets (1918)
 In Honor's Web (1919)
In the Balance 
The Island of Surprise 
The King of Diamonds 
The Love Doctor 
The Maelstrom 
The Man Who Won (1919)
 Milestones (1920)
The Other Man 
Partners of the Night (1920) 
Phantom Fortunes 
A Prince in a Pawnshop 
The Redemption of Dave Darcey 
Rose of the South 
 Shattered Dreams (1922)
Silent Strength (1919)
Soldiers of Chance 
The Stolen Treaty (1917)
 Tangled Lives (1918)
Transgression 
 When the Devil Drives (1922)
A Wonderful Wife

References

External links

1923 passport photo of Paul and wife Betty(courtesy Puzzlemaster, flickr.com)

Australian male stage actors
American male film actors
American film directors
American male silent film actors
Burials at Forest Lawn Memorial Park (Glendale)
1874 births
1954 deaths
20th-century American male actors
Australian emigrants to the United States
Vaudeville performers
Film directors from Melbourne
Male actors from Melbourne